Nale Ba or Naale Baa (English: "come tomorrow") (Kannada: ನಾಳೆ ಬಾ) is a popular folk legend which features prominently in areas across Karnataka, India. "Naale Baa" has been found written on the doors and walls of the towns and villages for certain years. Villagers write this on walls to prevent the entry of a malevolent spirit into their homes. It is believed that malevolent spirits or witches roam at night & take away children. In some variations, people used to believe that a witch or a male ghost roam around houses and call out the names of people without the phrase written above their door. If the person replies, he or she is said to die by vomiting blood. In some other variations of the myth, the spirit is believed to be a bridal ghost who roams around the town in search of her husband. She is known to take away the man of the house who is often the sole earning member of the family, therefore bringing bad luck to the entire household. There are also similar legends in states like Telangana and Andhra Pradesh.

Naale Baa was an urban legend that went viral during the 1990s in Karnataka. The myth is "A witch roams the streets in the night and knocks the door. The witch apparently speaks in voices of your kin so you would be deceived to open the door. If you open it then you will die." So the residents came up with a smart idea of writing "Naale Baa" outside the doors and the walls of their house. So when the ghost reads it and it goes back to come again the next day and the cycle repeats.

Origin

There was a renewed interest in her legend after reports of similar instances occurred same in a village in Thailand wherein healthy young men began to disappear right under their beds.

Popular culture
The 2018 Bollywood film Stree, starring Shraddha Kapoor and Rajkumar Rao, is based on the Naale Baa tale from Karnataka. Horror and Thriller writer K.Hari Kumar has penned a story inspired from Naale Baa incident in his 2019 book India's Most Haunted - Tales of Terrifying Places published by HarperCollins India.

References 

Ghosts
Urban legends
Asian ghosts
Reportedly haunted locations in India
Paranormal places in India
Superstitions of India
Indian folklore
Karnataka folklore
Indian legends
Indian legendary creatures
Hindu legendary creatures
Mass excitability in South Asian culture
History of Karnataka (1947–present)
1990s in Karnataka